Hon. Douglas Aird Hogarth,  (9 May 1927 – 17 September 1996) was a Liberal party member of the House of Commons of Canada. He was born in Saskatoon, Saskatchewan and became a barrister and solicitor by career.

He was first elected at the New Westminster riding in the 1968 general election and served one term, the 28th Canadian Parliament. Leaving office, Hogarth did not participate in further federal elections.

External links
 

1927 births
1996 deaths
20th-century Canadian lawyers
Canadian King's Counsel
Lawyers in Saskatchewan
Liberal Party of Canada MPs
Members of the House of Commons of Canada from British Columbia
Politicians from Saskatoon